Godínez is a Spanish family name.

As a surname
Juan Godínez (1517-1571) conquistador
Braulio Godínez (1984) Mexican football defender
Felipe Godínez (1588–1637) dramatist of the Spanish Golden Age
Said Godínez (1975) Mexican footballer
Godinez Fundamental High School a public high school in Santa Ana, California
Michael Wadding (priest) (1591–1644), Irish priest in Mexico, known as Miguel Godínez

Fictional characters
Godínez, a character from the Mexican sitcom El Chavo del Ocho

Other uses
 Godínez subculture

Spanish-language surnames